The position of Minister of State for Commonwealth Affairs was created in 1966 by the merger of the old positions of Minister of State for Commonwealth Relations and Minister of State for the Colonies. The position dealt with British relations with members of the Commonwealth of Nations. In 1968 the position was merged with the Minister of State for Foreign Affairs to create the new position of Minister of State for Foreign and Commonwealth Affairs.

Office Holders
1966: Judith Hart
1967: George Thomas (to 1968)
1968: The Lord Shepherd (to 1970)

Lists of government ministers of the United Kingdom
History of the Commonwealth of Nations
Defunct ministerial offices in the United Kingdom